Nikolaj Najdenov is a Bulgarian professional inline vert skater. Najdenov started skating when he was twelve years old in 1996 and turned professional in 2004. Najdenov has won many competitions in his vert skating career.

Best Tricks McTwist 1080

Vert Competitions  
2014 NL Contest, Strasbourg, France - Vert: 1st
2014 Montana Spring Sessions, Montanta, Bulgaria - Vert: 1st
2014 Kia World Extreme Games, Shanghai, China - Vert: 3rd
2013 Kia World Extreme Games, Shanghai, China - Vert: 4th
2011 Kia X Games Asia, Shanghai, China - Vert: 6th
2006 World Amateur Championships, Dallas, USA - Vert: 2nd
2006 European Inline Vert Championship, Montana, Bulgaria - Vert: 1st
2006 Vivatel Challenge - Big Air Contest, Montana, Bulgaria - Vert: 1st
2006 Open Inline Vert Contest, Montana, Bulgaria - Vert: 3rd
2006 Rennes sur Roulettes, Rennes, France - Vert: 4th
2005 SAG European Challenge, Berlin, Germany - Vert: 6th
2005 World Amateur Championships, Manchester, UK - Vert: 7th
2005 Inline Vert Competition, Nova Gorica, Slovenia - Vert: 3rd
2004 World Amateur Championships, Los Angeles, CA - Vert: 9th
2004 Core-Tour, Huntington Beach, CA: Competed in Round 3
2004 Core-Tour, New York City, NY - Vert: Competed in Round 2
2004 Mountain Dew Vert Competition, Sofia, Bulgaria - Vert: 1st
2003 Bulgarian National Inline Vert Championships: 1st
2002 Bulgarian National Inline Vert Championships: 1st

References

External links
actionsportstour.com
espn.go.com
velimira.info
blondesearch.ru
xsk8.de

1984 births
Living people
Vert skaters
X Games athletes